"Dirty Mind" is a single by The Pipettes. The first widely available release by the band, "Dirty Mind" was supported by a headline UK mini tour. It is available on CD, 7" vinyl and digital download it was released on 14 November 2005. It prompted the band to make their first music video and garnered airplay on many alternative radio shows including a playlist spot on 6Music. The CD b-sides were all session tracks recorded live for XFM's John Kennedy earlier the same year.

Track listing

CD single
"Dirty Mind"
"Tell Me What You Want" (XFM Session)
"We Are The Pipettes" (XFM Session)

7" single
"Dirty Mind"
"Because It's Not Love (But It's Still a Feeling)"

Chart positions

References

External links
Music video on YouTube

2005 singles
The Pipettes songs
2005 songs